The Roman Holidays is a half-hour Saturday morning animated series produced by Hanna-Barbera Productions and broadcast on NBC from September 9 to December 2, 1972. It ran for 13 episodes before being cancelled, and reruns were later shown on the USA Cartoon Express during the 1980s, Cartoon Network during the 1990s, and Boomerang during the 2000s.

The show was an attempt by Hanna-Barbera to replicate the success of their 1960-1966 show The Flintstones, with another modern family living in heavily fictionalized Roman times.

Plot
Very similar in theme to both The Flintstones and The Jetsons, The Roman Holidays brought a look at "marble age" life in Ancient Rome, as seen through the eyes of Augustus "Gus" Holiday and his family. The opening showed a chariot traffic jam and a TV showing football on Channel "IV". An Ancient Roman setting was one of the ideas that Hanna-Barbera considered when creating The Flintstones.

The Holidays, a Roman family living at the Venus DeMilo Arms Apartments in A.D. 63, dealt with a variety of modern-day problems. Gus Holiday worked at the Forum Construction Company for his demanding boss Mr. Tycoonius who is constantly threatening to fire Gus if an assignment he is given goes awry. He lived with his wife Laurie, children Precocia and Happius, and pet lion Brutus. Their neighbors are good friends Herman, Henrietta, and their daughter: Happy's girlfriend Groovia. Their lives are embittered by their exasperated landlord Mr. Evictus who tries to find proof of Brutus living with the Holidays, has a daughter named Snobbia, and excites Gus's tagline "Evictus will evict us!"

Cast
 Dom DeLuise as Mr. Evictus
 Daws Butler as Brutus the Lion
 Pamelyn Ferdin as Precocia Holiday
 Stanley Livingston as Happius Holiday
 Shirley Mitchell as Laurie Holiday
 Harold Peary as Herman
 Hal Smith as Mr. Tycoonius
 John Stephenson as
 Judy Strangis as Groovia
 Janet Waldo as Henrietta
 Dave Willock as Gus Holiday

Episodes

The Roman Holidays in other languages
 Brazilian Portuguese: Os Mussarelas ("The Mozzarellas")
 Galician: Festas de Roma ("Roma's Parties")
 German: Die verrückten Holidays ("The Crazy Holidays")
 Spanish: Roma me da risa ("Rome makes me laugh")
 Italian: S.P.Q.R. - Sembrano Proprio Quasi Romani ("They really seem almost Roman"), a play on the Latin initialism
In the UK, it had the same title, despite "roman holiday" being an American English noun. In the UK they say "busman's holiday."

Comics
Gold Key produced a comic book based on the series from November 1972 to August 1973. Only four issues were published. Pete Alvarado drew the first three; Jack Manning drew the final issue.

Home media
The first episode, "Double Date", is available on the DVD Saturday Morning Cartoons: 1970s Volume 1. On April 23, 2013, Warner Archive released The Roman Holidays: The Complete Series on DVD in region 1 as part of their Hanna–Barbera Classics Collection. This is a manufacture-on-demand (MOD) release, available exclusively through Warner's online store and Amazon.com.

Appearances in other media
Manatee versions of the characters Laurie and Precocia Holiday and Mr. Tycoonius appear as sirens in the Jellystone! episode "Balloon Kids". The rap song in the episode features a reference to the year the series was originally released (1972).

References

External links
 
 Episode Guide

See also
Asterix

1970s American animated television series
1972 American television series debuts
1973 American television series endings
American children's animated comedy television series
English-language television shows
Fiction set in ancient Rome
NBC original programming
Television shows adapted into comics
Television series by Hanna-Barbera
Television series set in the Roman Empire